Henry Robertson (born 22 October 1999 in Australia) is an Australian rugby union player who plays for the  in Super Rugby. His playing position is scrum-half. He was named in the Waratahs squad for the 2021 Super Rugby AU season. He had previously been named in the  squads for the 2020 Super Rugby season, but didn't make any appearances.

References

External links
Rugby.com.au profile
itsrugby.co.uk profile

1999 births
Australian rugby union players
Living people
Rugby union scrum-halves
New South Wales Waratahs players
Western Force players